Inishmore may refer to:

Inishmore, in the Aran Islands in County Galway, Ireland
 Inishmore (album), a 1997 album by Riot
MV Isle of Inishmore, a ferry
Inishmore, an island in Lough Erne, Ireland
Inishmore, or Deer Island, an island in County Clare, Ireland